Carlos Zubizarreta was a writer born in Asunción, Paraguay in 1904.

Infancy and youth 

Zubizarreta studied at the Colegio San José in Asunción and applied to study law at the Universidad Nacional de Asunción. Founder and director of the famous cultural magazine "Juventud" (Youth) and collaborator of "Alas" (Wings) magazine, he was to some the finest narrator and essayist and most elegant writer in the history of twentieth-century Paraguayan literature.

Career 

In his "Historia de la Literatura Paraguaya" (History of Paraguayan Literature, 1971), Hugo Rodríguez-Alcalá wrote that Zubizarreta "... published his first book of essays, "Acuarelas paraguayas" Paraguayan watercolours, in 1940. These "watercolours" are vivid portraits of customs and folklore painted by a skillful artist – but a painter-historian who sees the Paraguay of today with one eye, and with the other the Paraguay of the past, of Irala, of Montoya, of López y Aguirre and the rest. In effect, he barely starts to paint modern Asunción ... before its current landscape disappears and a vision of the city of Conquest and Colony arises ... ".

Works 

Other titles from this prolific writer include:

Final years 

He died in Asunción in 1972.

References 
 Centro Cultural de la República El Cabildo
 Diccionario Biográfico "FORJADORES DEL PARAGUAY", Primera Edición enero de 2000. Distribuidora Quevedo de Ediciones. Buenos Aires, Argentina.

External links 
 Anselm

1904 births
1972 deaths
People from Asunción
Paraguayan people of Basque descent
Paraguayan male writers
Universidad Nacional de Asunción alumni